Bel-Kyshtak is a village in Osh Region of Kyrgyzstan. It is part of the Kara-Suu District. Its population was 2,144 in 2021.

It is less than 1 km from the border with Uzbekistan, and 11 km northwest of Osh.

References

External links 
Satellite map at Maplandia.com

Populated places in Osh Region